Patrick Philippe (born 15 January 1962 in Saint-Julien-en-Genevois) is a French curler and curling coach.

He participated in the demonstration curling events at the 1992 Winter Olympics, where the French men's team finished in sixth place.

Teams

Record as a coach of national teams

References

External links 

 Video: 

Living people
1967 births
People from Saint-Julien-en-Genevois
Sportspeople from Haute-Savoie
French male curlers

Curlers at the 1992 Winter Olympics
Olympic curlers of France
French curling coaches